Kadaramandalagi  is a village in the southern state of Karnataka, India. It is located in the Byadgi taluk of Haveri district in Karnataka.

Demographics
 India census, Kadaramandalagi had a population of 5400 with 2735 males and 2665 females.

See also
 Haveri
 Districts of Karnataka

This place is famous for Kantesh Temple which attracts large number of devotes every year.

References

External links
 http://Haveri.nic.in/

Villages in Haveri district